Adrien Ries (14 July 1933 – 10 October 1991) was a Luxembourgian economist.  Much of his work revolved around transport economics, particularly the automobile, and the spatial implications of economic activity.  He was also responsible for coining the idea of 'Nordstad', a unified urban area in northern Luxembourg to decentralize economic activity from Luxembourg City and the Red Lands. From 1982 to 1966 he worked for the European Commission as an economist. He was also known as an avid hiker and author.

References

Luxembourgian economists
1933 births
1991 deaths
20th-century economists